The Coyote's Justice (Spanish: La justicia del Coyote) is a 1956 Mexican-Spanish western film directed by Joaquín Luis Romero Marchent and starring Abel Salazar, Gloria Marín and Manuel Monroy. Based on the character El Coyote created by J. Mallorquí. It was a sequel to the 1955 film The Coyote.

Plot 
Don Cesar de Echague, masquerading as the avenger "El Coyote", continues the American troops' fight against injustice and perversion of justice against the Hispanic population of California in the mid-1840s. At the same time, he courts the charming Leonor de Acevedo as a nobleman who lives inconspicuously. She rejects him at first because she only knows him as a cowardly nobleman, but rewards him with her love when she learns about his true calling.

Cast

References

Bibliography 
 de España, Rafael. Directory of Spanish and Portuguese film-makers and films. Greenwood Press, 1994.

External links 
 

1956 films
1956 Western (genre) films
Films directed by Joaquín Luis Romero Marchent
Mexican Western (genre) films
Spanish Western (genre) films
Spanish sequel films
1950s Spanish-language films
1950s Spanish films
1950s Mexican films
Spanish black-and-white films
Mexican black-and-white films